Bcl-2-interacting killer is a protein that in humans is encoded by the BIK gene.

Function 

The protein encoded by this gene is known to interact with cellular and viral survival-promoting proteins, such as BCL2 and the Epstein–Barr virus in order to enhance programmed cell death.  Because its activity is suppressed in the presence of survival-promoting proteins, this protein is suggested as a likely target for antiapoptotic proteins.  This protein shares a critical BH3 domain with other death-promoting proteins, BAX and BAK.

Interactions 

Bcl-2-interacting killer has been shown to interact with BCL2-like 1 and Bcl-2.

References

External links

Further reading